Ciocănești is a commune in Dâmbovița County, Muntenia, Romania. It is composed of five villages: Ciocănești, Crețu, Decindea, Urziceanca, and Vizurești.

The commune lies in the middle of the Wallachian Plain, on the right bank of the Colentina River.

Natives
 Alexandrina Cantacuzino (1876–1944), political activist, philanthropist, and diplomat
 Alexandru Cantacuzino (1901–1939), lawyer and politician

References

Communes in Dâmbovița County
Localities in Muntenia